Berndt David Assarsson (14 January 1892 – 31 December 1955) was a Swedish Catholic priest, monsignor, historical author and psalmist who resided in Helsingborg and Stockholm. He made efforts to develop Roman Catholicism in Sweden. He was born in Lund and died in Helsingborg.

Career 
He wrote the book Fädernas kyrka: En programskrift (1918). In 1920 he agreed to edit the Catholic magazine Credo and served as its editor until 1937. In 1922 he translated John Henry Newman's "Lead, Kindly Light" to Swedish "Led, mild light." He worked against the Swedish ban on creating Catholic monasteries, making reference to public statements about freedom of religion and to Norway and Denmark's allowance of such monasteries.

Publications

 Fädernas kyrka: En programskrift. Stockholm, 1918.
 Det skånska problemet. Stockholm, 1923.
 Den katolska kyrkan i Sverige i närvarande tid. Stockholm, 1925.
 Katolska kyrkan i Sverige. Uppsala, 1938.
 Skånelands historia i Skånelands skolor. Lund, 1949. 
 Katolska kyrkan i Sverige. Göteborg, 1953.

References

Further reading 

 Svensk uppslagsbok, Lund, 1929.
 L.B. Fabricius (1957). David Assarson – en pionerskikkelse (in Swedish). Catholica 1957: 2–3, pp. 62–85.

1892 births
1955 deaths
Converts to Roman Catholicism from Lutheranism
History of Scania
People from Lund
People from Scania
Swedish Roman Catholic hymnwriters
Swedish Jesuits
Swedish non-fiction writers
Swedish Roman Catholic priests
Swedish writers
Chaplains of His Holiness
20th-century Roman Catholic priests
20th-century non-fiction writers
20th century in Skåne County